Hemipolygona is a genus of sea snails, marine gastropod mollusks in the family Fasciolariidae, the spindle snails, the tulip snails and their allies.

Species
Species within the genus Hemipolygona include:
 Hemipolygona aldeynzeri (Garcia, 2001)
 Hemipolygona amaliae (Küster & Kobelt, 1874)
 Hemipolygona armata (A. Adams, 1854)
 Hemipolygona beckyae (Snyder, 2000)
 Hemipolygona bonnieae (Smythe, 1985)
 Hemipolygona carinifera (Lamarck, 1816)
 Hemipolygona centrifuga (Dall, 1915)
 Hemipolygona cuna (Petuch, 1990)
 Hemipolygona distincta (A. Adams, 1855)
 Hemipolygona lamyi Snyder, 2007
 Hemipolygona mcgintyi (Pilsbry, 1939)
 Hemipolygona mosselensis (Tomlin, 1932)
Species brought into synonymy
 Hemipolygona honkeri Snyder, 2006: synonym of Bullockus honkeri (Snyder, 2006)
 Hemipolygona mcmurrayi Clench & Aguayo, 1941: synonym of Bullockus mcmurrayi (Clench & Aguayo, 1941)
 Hemipolygona recurvirostra (Schubert & Wagner, 1829): synonym of Nodolatirus recurvirostra (Schubert & J. A. Wagner, 1829)
 Hemipolygona varai (Bullock, 1970): synonym of Bullockus varai (Bullock, 1970)

References

Fasciolariidae